Charlie Horton (born September 14, 1994) is an American soccer player. He is a former United States U23 international.

Career

United Kingdom
Upon turning pro, Horton was a backup goalkeeper for various clubs in the Football League Championship, and in Football League One. He was under a 3-year contract for Peterborough United, before being acquired by Cardiff City on a one-year contract and then by Leeds United on a 2-year deal.

United States 

Horton was released from Leeds after asking to leave due to a personal private matter on November 23, 2015. On March 4, 2016 Horton signed with D.C. United of Major League Soccer.

Immediately after signing with United, Horton was sent on loan to their third division affiliate, the Richmond Kickers, where he has been their primary goalkeeper. Horton made his professional debut on May 18, 2016, starting and playing the entire match against Aromas Café FC in the U.S. Open Cup second round. Horton recorded one save and had a shutout in the 4–0 victory.

Horton was recalled from his loan in July 2016. He suffered a serious hand injury that same month that would require surgery. It would sideline him for the rest of the 2016 regular season. It was his second injury of the season after he was out for 7 weeks with a concussion. In February 2017, Horton was released by United having never made a senior appearance with the squad.

Personal life 
On March 27, 2017, Horton filed a lawsuit against former D.C. United teammate Fabián Espíndola, coach Ben Olsen, and Major League Soccer. Espíndola allegedly assaulted Horton during practice and Horton received a concussion. The case is believed to have been resolved out of court.

Statistics

References

External links 
Twitter

1994 births
American soccer players
English footballers
USL Championship players
Cardiff City F.C. players
D.C. United players
Leeds United F.C. players
Peterborough United F.C. players
Richmond Kickers players
Living people
Soccer players from Ohio
United States men's under-23 international soccer players
Association football goalkeepers